Sergei Rylov (born 19 November 1975) is a former competitive figure skater who competed for Russia until 1997 and then for Azerbaijan until the end of his career, in 2002. He is a three-time (1998–2000) Golden Spin of Zagreb silver medalist, the 1995 Grand Prix International St. Gervais bronze medalist, the 1997 Skate Israel bronze medalist, and a four-time (1999–02) Azerbaijan national champion. He represented Azerbaijan at the 2002 Winter Olympics, where he placed 24th.

Programs

Competitive highlights
GP: Grand Prix

References

External links
 

1975 births
Living people
Azerbaijani male single skaters
Russian male single skaters
Figure skaters at the 2002 Winter Olympics
Olympic figure skaters of Azerbaijan
People from Pervouralsk
Competitors at the 2001 Winter Universiade
Sportspeople from Sverdlovsk Oblast